The Mascouten (also Mascoutin, Mathkoutench, Muscoden, or Musketoon) were a tribe of Algonquian-speaking Native Americans located in the Midwest. They are believed to have dwelt on both sides of the Mississippi River, adjacent to the present-day Wisconsin-Illinois border, after being driven out of Michigan by the Odawa.

The accounts of the Jesuit Relations frequently refer to the Mascouten as the "Fire Nation" or "Nation of Fire". One Jesuit writes: "The Fire Nation is erroneously so called, its correct name being Maskoutench, which means "a treeless country," like that inhabited by these people; but as, by changing a few letters, this Word is made to signify "fire," therefore the people have come to be called the Fire Nation."
Their name apparently comes either from a Fox word meaning "Little Prairie People" or from the Sauk term Mashkotêwi ("Prairie") or Mashkotêwineniwa ("Plains Indians") and shkotêwi ("fire") which would fit the Jesuits statement.  Historians do not know what they called themselves (autonym). The Huron knew them also as Atsistaeronnon ("people of the fire").

They are first mentioned in historic records by French missionaries, who described the people as inhabiting the southern area of present-day Michigan. The missionaries reported the Mascouten as being more populous than all the Neutral Nation, the Huron, and the Iroquois nations, put together. In 1712, the Mascouten united with the Kickapoo and the Fox, after almost being exterminated by the French and the Potawatomi.

Survivors migrated westward.  The Mascouten are last referred to as a band in historic records in 1779, when they were living on the Wabash River (in present-day Indiana) with peoples of the Piankashaw and the Kickapoo. The surviving Mascouten are noted in United States records of 1813 and 1825 as being part of the Kickapoo Prairie Band.

The city of Mascoutah, Illinois was named in 1839 after the Mascouten tribe.

The village of Moscow, Iowa County, Wisconsin is said to have been named after the Mascouten tribe.

References
Notes

Bibliography
Johnson, M. and Hook, R. The Native Tribes of North America, Compendium Publishing, 1992. 
"Wisconsin Historical Society." Wisconsin Historical Society. N.p., n.d. Web. 24 Feb. 2013. <http://www.wisconsinhistory.org/>.

External links
Mascouten history
Access Genealogy - Mascouten Indian Tribe History

Wisconsin Historical Society

Native American tribes in Illinois
Native American tribes in Wisconsin
Native American tribes in Iowa
Native American tribes in Michigan
Algonquian ethnonyms
Kickapoo